Here Comes the Fuzz is the debut studio album by British producer Mark Ronson. The album was released on 8 September 2003, led by the lead single, "Ooh Wee". Unlike Ronson's later releases, his debut album focuses more on the genre of hip-hop, with guest appearances from a number of famous rappers and hip-hop alumni, including Ghostface Killah, M.O.P., Nate Dogg, Saigon, Q-Tip, Sean Paul, and Mos Def. The album also features appearances from singers Rivers Cuomo, Jack White, and Daniel Merriweather, whose commercial breakthrough came with this album.

The album did not perform well chart wise, only peaking at No. 70 in Ronson's home territory, however it did sell more than 18,000 copies in the US. Ronson later addressed the failure of the album, often by joking that "only 12 people bought it." The album has sold 92,676 copies in the UK as of January 2015.

Recording
The song "International Affair" was originally released on Sean Paul's 2002 album Dutty Rock, and featured vocals from Debi Nova instead of Tweet. Nova contributes vocals to the album track "Tomorrow". Rolling Stone predicted the album would stop the critical ill-will towards Ronson, saying Ronson "serves up a grab bag of pumping beats." Entertainment Weekly gave the album a C, saying "the collection's overall disco-licious come-together vibe is cloying and insubstantial." The popularity of the album grew following the release of the follow-up album Version in 2007, which saw Ronson collaborate with a number of well-known British and American artists on covers of well-known songs.

Singles
 "Ooh Wee", featuring vocals from Ghostface Killah, Nate Dogg, Trife Diesel and Saigon, was released as the album's lead single on 20 October 2003. The song was a top twenty hit in the United Kingdom and Ireland, and the single also charted at No. 80 on the United States Hot R&B/Hip-Hop Songs chart and No. 83 in Australia.
 "NYC Rules", featuring vocals from Daniel Merriweather and Saigon, was released as the album's second single on 16 February 2004. The single was only released in Australia, and for its release, was re-titled "City Rules". It was promoted as Merriweather's first single in the country, and the cover art stated Ronson as the featured artist. The track peaked at No. 76 on the ARIA Charts.

Track listing

 "Ooh Wee" samples "Sunny" by Boney M. and "Scorpio" by Dennis Coffey.

Chart performance

Release history

References

2003 debut albums
Elektra Records albums
Mark Ronson albums
Albums produced by Mark Ronson